The Dove Campaign for Real Beauty is a worldwide marketing campaign launched by Unilever in 2004 aiming to build self confidence in women and young children. Dove's partners in the campaign included Ogilvy, Edelman Public Relations, and Harbinger Communications (in Canada) along with other consultants. Part of the overall project was the Evolution campaign.

Campaign
In 2004, Dove and Ogilvy organized a photography exhibit titled "Beyond Compare: Women Photographers on Real Beauty". The show featured work from 67 female photographers which led to the Real Beauty campaign. The Dove Real Beauty campaign was conceived in 2004 during a three-year creative strategic research effort, conducted in partnership with three universities, led by Joah Santos. The creative was conceived by Ogilvy Düsseldorf and London.

The research created a new consumer-centric versus product-centric advertising strategy, which Joah Santos named (iconic Point Of View) P.O.V. - Purpose | Objective | Vision. The strategy led all top five Campaigns of the Century, as rated by Ad Age and increased sales from $2 billion to $4 billion in three years. The strategy discarded the brand essence ladder typically used by Unilever and called for a POV strategy "To make women feel comfortable in the skin they are in and to create a world where beauty is a source of confidence and not anxiety." All campaigns for Dove Real Beauty need then to follow the POV strategy set forth, each with their own insight. The initial campaign insight/tension was an indication that only two percent of women consider themselves beautiful. It was created by Ogilvy Düsseldorf and London.
 
The first stage of the campaign centered on a series of billboard advertisements, initially put up in Germany and United Kingdom, and later worldwide. The spots showcased photographs of regular women (in place of professional models), taken by noted portrait photographer Rankin. The ads invited bypassers to vote on whether a particular model was, for example, "Fat or Fab" or "Wrinkled or Wonderful", with the results of the votes dynamically updated and displayed on the billboard itself. Accompanying the billboard advertisements was the publication of the "Dove Report", a corporate study which Unilever intended to "[create] a new definition of beauty [which] will free women from self-doubt and encourage them to embrace their real beauty."

The series received significant media coverage from talk shows, women's magazines, and mainstream news broadcasts and publications, generating media exposure which Unilever has estimated to be worth more than 30 times the paid-for media space. Following this success, the campaign expanded into other media with a series of television spots (Flip Your Wigs and the Pro-Age series, among others) and print advertisements ("Tested on Real Curves"), culminating in the 2006 Little Girls global campaign, which featured regional versions of the same advertisement in both print and screen, for which Unilever purchased a 30-second spot in the commercial break during Super Bowl XL at an estimated cost of $2.5 million.

In 2006, Ogilvy were seeking to extend the campaign further, by creating one or more viral videos to host on the Campaign for Real Beauty website. The first of these, Daughters, was an interview-style piece intended to show how mothers and daughters related to issues surrounding the modern perception of beauty and the beauty industry. The film, Daughters, touches upon the self-esteem issues found in many young girls today. Dove's Self-Esteem Fund supports their campaign by using statistics that demonstrate how young women and girls are more apt to have distorted views of beauty. It was during the production of Daughters that a series of short films entitled "Beauty Crackdown" was pitched to Unilever as an "activation idea". The concept was one that art director Tim Piper, who proposed to create Evolution with the budget left over from Daughters (C$135,000), pushed. It was originally intended to get people to the Campaign for Real Beauty website to see Daughters, and to participate in the workshops featured on the site. After Evolution, Ogilvy produced Onslaught and Amy. Onslaught is an emotional video about the harsh reality of young girls and the influence that the beauty industry can have on them.

In April 2013, a video titled Dove Real Beauty Sketches was released as part of the campaign, created by Hugo Veiga. It went viral, attracting strong reactions from the public and media. In the video, several women describe themselves to a forensic sketch artist who cannot see his subjects. The same women are then described by strangers whom they met the previous day. The sketches are compared, with the stranger's image invariably being both more flattering and more accurate. The differences create strong reactions when shown to the women.

In October 2013, Free Being Me, a collaboration between Dove and the World Association of Girl Guides and Girl Scouts was launched, with the aim of increasing "self-esteem and body confidence" in girls.

In 2017, Dove and Ogilvy London created limited-edition versions of body wash bottles meant to look like different body shapes and sizes. Dove produced 6,800 bottles of the six different designs and sent them to 15 different countries.

Reaction
Individual ads caused different reactions; both positive and negative. Evolution won two Cannes Lions Grand Prix awards. Writing for The Daily Telegraph, Katy Young called Real Beauty Sketches; "[Dove's] most thought provoking film yet [...]. Moving, eye opening and in some ways saddening, this is one campaign that will make you think, and hopefully, feel more beautiful."

The campaign has been criticized on the grounds that Unilever also produces Fair and Lovely, a skin-lightening product marketed at dark-skinned women in several countries. It was also widely noted that Unilever brand Lynx's advertising campaign would seemingly contradict the sentiment of the Campaign for Real Beauty. Moreover, Unilever owns Axe hygiene products, which are marketed to men using overtly sexualized women, and SlimFast diet bars. Writing for Forbes, Will Burns called such criticism "totally irrelevant". He explained: "No one thinks of Dove as a Unilever brand, for starters (nor should Dove) [...]. But more to the point, does Dove's idea mean teen boys don't still want to smell good for the ladies? Or that people who are overweight don't want to lose a few pounds? These are different brands solving problems for completely different audiences." The criticism has also been justified from others that state their concerns that the images that Dove portrays in their ads are supposed to be unedited and "real"; however, there have been comments made stating they have been photoshopped to smooth the appearance of the women's skin, hide wrinkles and blemishes, fix stray hairs, etc. Photo retoucher Pascal Dangin, who works for Box Studios in New York, told The New Yorker he made edits to the photos, "Do you know how much retouching was on that?" he asked. "But it was great to do, a challenge, to keep everyone's skin and faces showing the mileage but not looking unattractive." The women who are targeted by these ads have mixed reviews as well. Some women were turned off that Dove was in essence telling them they knew the insecurities they felt and what all women felt. Social networking sites such as Facebook became an outlet for women to express their praise and criticism.

The campaign has been criticized positively and negatively by consumers, critiques, and other companies because of the way Dove has chosen to portray their messages for their audience. Writing for The New York Times, Tanzina Vega produced the article "Ad About Women's Self-Image Creates a Sensation". In this piece it portrayed how different people viewed the Dove Real Beauty Campaign in different ways. First, was "Brenda Fiala; a senior vice president for strategy at Blast Radius, a digital advertising agency. Fiala stated that Dove was trying to create a sense of trust with the consumer by tapping into deep-seated emotions that many women feel about themselves and their appearance". What she also believed for the Dove Real Beauty Campaign was that the campaign "hits on a real human truth for women", and that, "Many women undervalue themselves and also the way they look". On the other hand, in this same ad, it states that some people criticized the ad's for the campaign believing they were contradicting with their true message. In the article by Vega; Jazz Brice, 24, a viewer of the campaign, explains during an interview how she took the messages from the Dove Real Beauty Campaign "I think it makes people much more susceptible to absorbing the subconscious messages, and that at the heart of it all is that beauty is still what defines women. It is a little hypocritical". The campaign has had an impact worldwide in both positive and negative ways with the help of Dove's social media outlets such as; Facebook and Twitter. The Dove Campaign was one of the first campaigns to be considered as going "viral" in the sense that to be viral was new and generally unknown at the time of the beginning of the campaign (2004). Some viewers received the message as a positive impact to the way women were viewed while other viewed it as the opposite.

With the positive and negative feedback received from the viewers and consumers of the campaign the Dove Company did not just want to "talk" to media about the problem they wanted to "act" on the issues and embrace the advantages of the campaign for the future. In the article, "Dove' Real Beauty Campaign Turns 10: How a Brand Tried To Change The Conversation About Female Beauty", written by Nina Bahadur from the HuffPost interviewed a spokesperson for the Dove Company about the types of feed back they have got from the Dove Real Beauty Campaign and how it has impacted the company. Sharon MacLeod, vice president of Unilever North America Personal Care, told HuffPost; "[We were thinking], we have to walk the talk" she also stated, "We can't just be getting people stirred up; awareness and conversation isn't enough. We actually have to do something to change what's happening." Since the start of the campaign, Dove has started funds for women and girls to promote their message along with more advertisings in attempt to bring more awareness to women of different ages and cultural background. The company of Dove believes they still have a chance to bring a greater impact on society and the generations to come when it comes to the impact of societies’ views of beauty and the impact it has on women and young girls. As stated in the interview with MacLeod, "We're going to try to change a generation", MacLeod tells HuffPost "You have to wait until they grow up to see what happens." Some critiques on the other hand believe that the campaign focuses to greatly on the physical aspect of beauty instead of other areas that should have more focus. From The Cut, Ann Friedman states the following about the Dove Real Beauty Campaign: "These ads still uphold the notion that, when it comes to evaluating ourselves and other women, beauty is paramount. The goal shouldn't be to get women to focus on how we are all gorgeous in our own way. It should be to get women to do for ourselves what we wish the broader culture would do: judge each other based on intelligence and wit and ethical sensibility, not just our faces and bodies." Critics and defenders of the Dove Real Beauty Campaign have both pointed out on occasion that because Dove is trying to redefine what society and women believe as beauty does not essentially mean that women and younger girls will feel different about themselves, this is also stated by Ann Friedman when she suggests to the HuffPost as evidence that Dove's message about beauty is important and necessary. An estimated 80 percent of American women feel dissatisfied with their bodies, and 81 percent of 10-year-old girls are afraid of becoming "fat". Can a series of ad campaigns really change institutionalized body hatred?

References

Further reading

Advertising campaigns
Beauty
Unilever